Megachile wfkirbyi is a species of bee in the family Megachilidae. It was described by W.F. Kirby in 1900, and renamed by Kohl in 1906.

References

wfkirbyi
Insects described in 1900